

Dudley West  is a locality in the  Australian state  of South Australia located on the south coast of Dudley Peninsula on Kangaroo Island overlooking the body of water known in Australia as the Southern Ocean and by international authorities as the Great Australian Bight.

Its boundaries were created in March 2002 for the “long established name.”  The locality is reported as being so named because it is located in the western part of the cadastral unit of the Hundred of Dudley.

The land use within the locality is divided between agriculture and conservation with the latter land use being concerned with both the protected area, the Dudley Conservation Park, and land being subject to native vegetation heritage agreements.

Dudley West is located within the federal division of Mayo, the state electoral district of Mawson and the local government area of the Kangaroo Island Council.

References
Notes

Citations

Towns on Kangaroo Island
Dudley Peninsula